Pot roast is an American beef dish made by slow cooking a usually tough cut of beef in moist heat. Tougher cuts such as chuck steak, bottom round, short ribs and 7-bone roast are preferred for this technique. These cuts are American terms; different terms and butchering styles are used throughout the Anglophone world and beyond. While the toughness of the fibers makes them unsuitable for oven roasting, slow cooking tenderizes the meat as the beef imparts some of its flavor to the water.

Browning the roast before adding liquid is an optional step to improve the flavor. Browning can occur at lower temperatures with a longer cooking time, but the result is less intense than a high temperature sear. Either technique can be used when making pot roast. The result is tender, succulent meat and a rich liquid that lends itself to gravy.

In the US, where it is also known as "Yankee pot roast", the dish is often served with vegetables such as carrots, potatoes and onions simmered in the cooking liquid.  Pot roast is a dish with influences from the French dish boeuf à la mode, the German dish sauerbraten, and Ashkenazi meat stews. The more recent "Mississippi Pot Roast" is typically made with chuck, ranch flavored seasoning powder, and pepperoncini.

Origins
According to the food writer James Beard, French immigrants to New England brought their cooking method called à l'étouffée for tenderizing meats. Later immigrants from Germany to Pennsylvania and the Mid West cooked sauerbraten and marinated roasts, larded and slow-cooked for taste and tenderness. In New Orleans, daube was a popular dish. Jewish immigrants brought in adaptations from Hungary, Austria, and Russia.

Similar dishes 
Boliche is a Cuban pot roast dish consisting of  eye round beef roast stuffed with ham browned in olive oil simmered in water with onions until the meat is soft, and then quartered potatoes added.

See also
 Lancashire hotpot
 List of beef dishes
 Nikujaga

References

External links
 

Beef dishes
German-American cuisine
Polish cuisine
Czech cuisine
Slovak cuisine
Slovenian cuisine
Hungarian cuisine
Austrian cuisine
Ashkenazi Jewish cuisine
Russian cuisine
Balkan cuisine